Bjarne Røyland (born 26 January 1971) is a Norwegian bobsledder, born in Mandal.

He competed at the 2002 Winter Olympics in Salt Lake City, where he placed 20th in men's two, together with Arnfinn Kristiansen, and also participated in men's four.

References

External links

1971 births
Living people
People from Mandal, Norway
Norwegian male bobsledders
Olympic bobsledders of Norway
Bobsledders at the 2002 Winter Olympics
Sportspeople from Agder